The Baku International Film Festival East-West, is the international film festival in Azerbaijan. It is non-profit cultural event that takes place every year.

The first edition of the Festival was held in 1991, in Baku.

The official languages of the festival are Azerbaijani.

References

Film festivals in Azerbaijan
Film festivals established in 1991
1991 establishments in Azerbaijan